Derlis David Meza Colli (born 15 August 1988), simply known as  David Meza,  is a Paraguayan professional footballer who plays as a central midfielder for Liga I club FC Argeș Pitești.

Career
Meza has played the 2008–09 season with PAS Giannina of Beta Ethniki on loan from his club Atromitos.
On 3 September 2013 David, and his brother César, signed for Azerbaijan Premier League side Inter Baku on a 1-year contract. Meza signed a new 1-year contract with Inter Baku in May 2014. On 31 August 2015, Meza signed a one-year contract with another Azerbaijan Premier League side, Gabala. On 20 December 2015, Meza was released from his Gabala contract six-months early.

On 6 January 2016, Meza signed for Cerro Porteño.

On 30 July 2017, Meza signed a one-year contract with Neftchi Baku.

On 27 July 2019, Meza was announced as a member of Petrolul Ploiești squad for the 2019–20 season.

References

External links

1988 births
Living people
Sportspeople from Asunción
Paraguayan emigrants to Spain
Paraguayan people of Italian descent
Paraguayan footballers
Association football midfielders
Atromitos F.C. players
Ethnikos Piraeus F.C. players
PAS Giannina F.C. players
Messiniakos F.C. players
A.C. Cesena players
F.C. Pavia players
Shamakhi FK players
Gabala FC players
Cerro Porteño players
Neftçi PFK players
FC Petrolul Ploiești players
FC Argeș Pitești players
Super League Greece players
Football League (Greece) players
Serie B players
Serie C players
Azerbaijan Premier League players
Paraguayan Primera División players
Liga I players
Liga II players
Paraguayan expatriate footballers
Paraguayan expatriate sportspeople in Greece
Expatriate footballers in Greece
Paraguayan expatriate sportspeople in Italy
Expatriate footballers in Italy
Paraguayan expatriate sportspeople in Azerbaijan
Expatriate footballers in Azerbaijan
Paraguayan expatriate sportspeople in Romania
Expatriate footballers in Romania